477th may refer to:

477th Bombardment Squadron, inactive United States Air Force unit
477th Fighter Group, the Air Force Reserve Command's first F-22A Raptor unit
477th Tactical Fighter Squadron, inactive United States Air Force unit

See also
477 (number)
477, the year 477 (CDLXXVII) of the Julian calendar
477 BC